Péter Fecsi  (born 21 July 1905) was a Romanian male handball player. He was a member of the Romania men's national handball team, playing as a goalkeeper. He was part of the  team at the 1936 Summer Olympics. On club level he played for Viforul Dacia București in Romania.

References

1905 births
Romanian male handball players
Field handball players at the 1936 Summer Olympics
Olympic handball players of Romania
Place of birth missing
Year of death missing